Eremogone aculeata (syn. Arenaria aculeata) is a species of flowering plant in the family Caryophyllaceae known by the common name prickly sandwort. It is native to the western United States, where it grows in the southern sagebrush steppe, mountainous areas, and volcanic soils, as well as on rocky slopes.

This is a mat-forming perennial herb growing in clumps of waxy foliage on short, hairy, glandular stems. The leaves are very thin and pointed, somewhat needlelike, and up to 3 or 4 centimeters long. The inflorescence is an open array of flowers with five lance-shaped to oval white petals each one half to one centimeter long. The fruit is a toothed capsule containing several small yellowish seeds.

References

External links
Jepson Manual Treatment
USDA Plants Profile
Flora of North America
Photo gallery

Caryophyllaceae
Flora of the Western United States
Flora of California
Flora of the Sierra Nevada (United States)
Plants described in 1871
Flora without expected TNC conservation status